The Twentieth Oklahoma Legislature was a meeting of the legislative branch of the government of Oklahoma, composed of the Oklahoma Senate and the Oklahoma House of Representatives. The state legislature met in regular session from January 2 to April 26, 1945, during the term of Governor Robert S. Kerr.

Although the session began with John Davis Hill as Speaker of the Oklahoma House of Representatives, he was replaced with H.I. Hinds in February. Homer Paul served as President pro tempore of the Oklahoma Senate.

Dates of session
Session: January 2, 1945 – April 26, 1945
Previous: 19th Legislature • Next: 21st Legislature

Leadership and staff
Homer Paul served as President pro tempore of the Oklahoma Senate. John Davis Hill of Tulsa, Oklahoma was selected as Speaker of the Oklahoma House of Representatives with the support of Governor Robert S. Kerr. In February 1945, he was replaced by  session, he was replaced by H. I. Hinds of Tahlequah, Oklahoma, for the remainder of the 1945 session. H. R. Christopher served as the Chief Clerk of the Oklahoma House of Representatives.

Party composition

Senate

House of Representatives

Members

Senate

Table based on Oklahoma Almanac.

House of Representatives

Table based on government database.

References

Oklahoma legislative sessions
1945 in Oklahoma
1946 in Oklahoma
1945 U.S. legislative sessions
1946 U.S. legislative sessions